Doujiang is fresh soy milk in Chinese cuisine. It can be served hot or cool, sweet or savoury. Sometimes, it is lightly curdled with vinegar. It is a common breakfast item served with youtiao.

Chinese speakers differentiate doujiang from dounai, which is the dairy-like soy milk that comes in packs and are used in items such as soy latte. Usually, doujiang is served in a bowl, and dounai is served in a cup.

References 

Breakfast dishes
Chinese drinks
Taiwanese drinks